The Ernest and Mary Hemingway House, in Ketchum, Idaho, was listed on the National Register of Historic Places in 2015. The National Register does not disclose its location but rather lists it as "Address restricted." The property is the last undeveloped property of its size within the city limits of Ketchum.

The house was built  in 1953 for Henry J. "Bob" Topping Jr. It is a two-story,  home in Ketchum, west of the Big Wood River. Similar to the Sun Valley Lodge a few miles away, its exterior walls are concrete, poured into rough-sawn forms and then acid-stained to simulate wood. It was sold to Hemingway in 1959 for its asking price of $50,000, and the Hemingways occupied it in November 1959.

On the morning of Sunday, July 2, 1961, Hemingway died in the home of a self-inflicted head wound from a shotgun. After a brief funeral four days later, he was buried at the city cemetery.

The Nature Conservancy acquired ownership in 1986.; in May 2017, ownership was transferred to the Community Library, a privately funded public library.

See also
Birthplace of Ernest Hemingway
Dr. Clarence E. Hemingway House, 600 N. Kenilworth, Oak Park, Illinois, where he lived from 1905 to 1918, a contributing property in the Frank Lloyd Wright Prairie School of Architecture Historic District
Ernest Hemingway House, Key West, Florida
House at 339 N. Oak Park Ave., Oak Park, Illinois where he was born in 1899 and lived until 1905, a contributing property in the Frank Lloyd Wright Prairie School of Architecture Historic District
Pfeiffer House and Carriage House
Spear-O-Wigwam Ranch, a Wyoming dude ranch with "Hemingway Cabin" where Hemingway wrote Farewell to Arms 
Windemere, childhood family summer cottage on Walloon Lake, in Michigan, NRHP-listed in 1979

References

External links
Palin's Travels – Hemingway Adventure

Houses on the National Register of Historic Places in Idaho
National Register of Historic Places in Blaine County, Idaho
Houses completed in 1953
Homes of American writers